Sahiwal Tehsil is an administrative sub-division (tehsil) of Sahiwal District, Punjab, Pakistan. Its capital city is Sahiwal.

Tehsils of Punjab, Pakistan
Sahiwal District